Beat Hefti (born 3 February 1978) is a Swiss bobsledder who has competed since the late 1990s. Competing in four Winter Olympics, he  has won a total of four Olympic medals. A gold medal in Sochi (two-man, 2014), two bronze medals in Torino (two-man and four-man, 2006) and another bronze medal in Salt Lake City (two-man, 2002).

Hefti has also won four medals at the World Championships with one gold (Four-man: 2007), one silver (Four-man: 1999), and two bronzes (Two-man: 2001, 2005).

He won the Bobsleigh World Cup two-man title in 2009 and 2012.

References

Bobsleigh two-man Olympic medalists 1932–56 and since 1964
Bobsleigh four-man Olympic medalists for 1924, 1932–56, and since 1964
Bobsleigh two-man world championship medalists since 1931
Bobsleigh four-man world championship medalists since 1930

Website Beat Hefti

External links
 
 
 
 
 

1978 births
Bobsledders at the 2002 Winter Olympics
Bobsledders at the 2006 Winter Olympics
Bobsledders at the 2010 Winter Olympics
Bobsledders at the 2014 Winter Olympics
Living people
Olympic gold medalists for Switzerland
Olympic bronze medalists for Switzerland
Olympic bobsledders of Switzerland
Swiss male bobsledders
Olympic medalists in bobsleigh
Medalists at the 2006 Winter Olympics
Medalists at the 2002 Winter Olympics
Medalists at the 2014 Winter Olympics
People from Appenzell Ausserrhoden
21st-century Swiss people